Grafton Township may refer to one of the following places in the United States:

 Grafton Township, McHenry County, Illinois
 Grafton Township, Sibley County, Minnesota
 Grafton Township, Fillmore County, Nebraska
 Grafton Township, Walsh County, North Dakota
 Grafton Township, Lorain County, Ohio
 Grafton Township, Miner County, South Dakota

See also 

Grafton (disambiguation)

Township name disambiguation pages